The Archaeological Museum of Astros is a museum in Αstros, Arcadia, Greece. It is located in a building which has been used as Karytsiotis school, since the second half of the twentieth century. In 1985, the building was converted into a museum by the Ephor of Antiquities, Dr. Theodoros Spyropoulos. The courtyard of the building was similarly adapted into an archaeological park.

See also
 Anthene (Cynuria)

References

External links
 Hellenic Ministry of Culture and Tourism

Astros
Museums established in 1985
Buildings and structures in Arcadia, Peloponnese
1985 establishments in Greece